Persona Non Grata is the third studio release by Dutch rap metal band Urban Dance Squad. With the departure of DJ DNA, the band took a more aggressive approach than on their previous two albums, resulting in a largely hard rock and heavy metal influenced album. The stylistic change resulted in some moderate European success. The album was released in April 1994. The song "Demagogue" became a European club hit. The band can be seen performing the album's track "Good Grief!" in the 1995 film, Hackers.

Persona Non Grata was reissued in 1999 as a two-disc set with the second disc consisting of live material.

Track listing

 Demagogue (4:14)
 Good Grief!    (4:31)
 No Honestly!  (3:28)
 Alienated  (5:18)
 Candy Strip Exp.  (4:51)
 Selfsufficient Snake  (5:29)
 (Some) Chitchat  (5:07)
 Burnt Up Cigarette  (4:09)
 Selfstyled  (3:17)
 Mugshot  (3:14)
 Hangout  (3:39)
 Downer  (9:38)

Charts

Weekly charts

Year-end charts

References

1994 albums
Urban Dance Squad albums
Capitol Records albums
Rap metal albums